Holiday in Paris: Paris is a French short film directed by John Nasht in 1951.

Synopsis 
Dolores Gray arrives in Paris to discover dance and singing numbers.

Songs

Anecdote 
This is the first film where the songs C'est si bon and Hymne à l'amour are sung with the English lyrics.

References

External links 

1951 short films
1951 films
French black-and-white films
French short films
French musical films
1951 comedy films
1950s French films